{{Automatic taxobox
| image = Oropendola costa rica.jpg
| image_caption = Montezuma oropendola (Psarocolius montezuma)
| taxon = Psarocolius
| authority = Wagler, 1827
| subdivision = See text| synonyms = * Gymnostinops Sclater, 1886 (but see text)
}}

Oropendolas are a genus of passerine birds, Psarocolius, in the New World blackbird family Icteridae. They were formerly split among two or three different genera and are found in Central and South America. 

All the oropendolas are large birds with pointed bills, and long tails which are always at least partially bright yellow. Males are usually larger than females.

The plumage is typically chestnut, dark brown or black, although the Green oropendola and olive oropendola have, as their names imply, an olive coloration to the head, breast and upper back. The legs are dark, but the bill is usually a strikingly contrasting feature, either pale yellow, or red-tipped with a green or black base. In several species there is also a blue or pink bare cheek patch.

Oropendolas are birds associated with forests or, for a few species, more open woodland. They are colonial breeders, with several long woven basket nests in a tree, each hanging from the end of a branch.

These gregarious birds eat large insects and fruit. They are very vocal, producing a wide range of songs and calls, sometimes including mimicry.

Systematics

The following species are recognised in the genus Psarocolius:
 Black oropendola (Psarocolius guatimozinus)
 Chestnut-headed oropendola (Psarocolius wagleri)
 Russet-backed oropendola (Psarocolius angustifrons)
 Dusky-green oropendola (Psarocolius atrovirens)
 Green oropendola (Psarocolius viridis)
 Crested oropendola (Psarocolius decumanus)

Former species
Four species of oropendolas were formerly separated in the genus Gymnostinops. Alternatively, the crested oropendola (and possibly others) would also belong here (Price & Lanyon 2002):
 Montezuma oropendola (Psarocolius montezuma)
 Baudo oropendola (Psarocolius cassini)
 Olive oropendola (Psarocolius bifasciatus)

Price & Lanyon (2002) used mtDNA cytochrome b and NADH dehydrogenase subunit 2 sequence data to research oropendola phylogeny. As is fairly obvious from morphology, the band-tailed oropendola, Ocyalus latirostris and casqued oropendola, Psarocolius oseryi are the most distinct species of oropendolas. In fact, they appear to be more closely related to the caciques and both species would be classified in the genus Ocyalus. Alternatively, the casqued oropendola may be separated in Clypicterus, which like Ocyalus would then be a monotypic genus.

 References 
ffrench, Richard; O'Neill, John Patton & Eckelberry, Don R. (1991): A guide to the birds of Trinidad and Tobago (2nd edition). Comstock Publishing, Ithaca, N.Y.. 
Hilty, Steven L. (2003): Birds of Venezuela. Christopher Helm, London. 
Jaramillo, Alvaro & Burke, Peter (1999): New World Blackbirds. Christopher Helm, London. 

Stiles, F. Gary & Skutch, Alexander Frank (1989): A guide to the birds of Costa Rica''. Comistock, Ithaca.

External links

Oropendola videos, photos and sounds - Internet Bird Collection